Events from the year 1577 in Sweden

Incumbents
 Monarch – John III

Events

 - The arrival of the Pope's ambassador Antonio Possevino to Sweden.
 - The so-called Röda boken (The Read Book), a church service which establishes a compromise between Protestantism and Catholic, is introduced. 
 - Tre Kronor (castle) is rebuilt as a renaissance palace. 
 - John III takes the title Grand Prince of Finland.
 - Sigrid Sture appointed governor of Stranda Hundred.

Births

 - Johan Skytte, soldier and politician  (died 1645) 
 - Jesper Mattson Cruus af Edeby,  soldier and politician  (died 1622)

Deaths

 - Eric XIV of Sweden, monarch  (born 1533) 
 - Jakob Bagge, admiral  (born 1502)

References

 
Years of the 16th century in Sweden
Sweden